We'll Live And Die in These Towns is the debut album of British indie rock band The Enemy, released on 9 July 2007. It went to number #1 on its first week of release in the British album charts. It peaked at #34 on the World Album Chart.

The album reached #75 in the UK end of year chart selling around 222,000 copies in 2007.
In February 2008 it was given platinum certification meaning sales of over 300,000 copies.

A low-quality version of the full album was leaked on 3 July 2007, containing both demo and non-album versions of particular songs.

For the single release of "This Song", it was renamed "This Song Is About You".

The song "Aggro", which appears on the album, is featured in the video game Guitar Hero World Tour.

Reception

Critical response to We'll Live and Die in These Towns tended toward the positive. At Metacritic, which assigns a normalized rating out of 100 to reviews from mainstream critics, the album has received an average score of 61, based on 11 reviews.

Track listing
"Aggro" – 3:25
"Away from Here" – 3:02
"Pressure" – 3:18
"Had Enough" - 2:39
"We'll Live and Die in These Towns" – 3:54
"You're Not Alone" – 3:44
"It's Not OK" – 3:35
"Technodanceaphobic" – 2:34
"40 Days and 40 Nights" – 3:36
"This Song" – 4:25
"Happy Birthday Jane" – 2:59
Bonus tracks:
"Five Years" (David Bowie cover) - 4:31
"Fear Killed the Youth of our Nation" - 3:31

Writers
All songs written by Tom Clarke

Signing Session
On 9 July, the day of release of the album, the band played a special set at HMV Oxford Street in London and in Coventry.

The album 'We'll Live And Die in These Towns' went to number 1 on 15 July.

Charts

Weekly charts

Year-end charts

References

2007 debut albums
The Enemy (UK rock band) albums
Warner Records albums
Albums produced by Owen Morris